John O'Grady may refer to:

John O'Grady (athlete) (1891–1934), Irish Olympic shot putter
John O'Grady (hurler) (born 1931), Irish hurler
John O'Grady (priest) (1886–1966), Irish-American sociologist, economist, social reformer
John O'Grady (writer) (1907–1981), Australian writer
John O'Grady (American football) (born 1954),  American football player and coach